Marc Didden (born 28 July 1949) is a Belgian film director. He and his family moved to Brussels when he was age 2. He grew up in Brussels and studied Film Direction and Playwriting there.

Didden was rock journalist and critic for the Flemish magazine HUMO for many years, before he started directing movies in the 1980s.

Filmography

As director
 Brussels By Night (1983)
 Istanbul (1985)
 Sailors don't cry (1988)
 Mannen maken plannen (1993)
 Cheb (short film)

As actor
 Het Sacrament (1989) - Gigi

TV
 Tip Toe Thru The Tulips (1994), with Hugo Claus
 't Bolleken (1988)

Bibliography
 May I Quest You an Askion (2000)
 Enkele Interviews (1980)

External links
 

1949 births
Living people
Belgian film directors
Belgian film actors
Belgian journalists
Male journalists
Flemish journalists
Belgian music critics
People from Hamont-Achel
20th-century Belgian people